Stendhal syndrome, Stendhal's syndrome or Florence syndrome is a psychosomatic condition involving rapid heartbeat, fainting, confusion and even hallucinations, allegedly occurring when individuals become exposed to objects, artworks, or phenomena of great beauty and antiquity.
The affliction is named after the 19th-century French author Stendhal (pseudonym of Marie-Henri Beyle), who described his experience with the phenomenon during his 1817 visit to Florence in his book Naples and Florence: A Journey from Milan to Reggio. When he visited the Basilica of Santa Croce, where Niccolò Machiavelli, Michelangelo and Galileo Galilei are buried, he was overcome with profound emotion. Stendhal wrote:

Although psychologists have long debated whether Stendhal syndrome exists, the apparent effects on some individuals are severe enough to warrant medical attention. The staff at Florence's Santa Maria Nuova hospital are accustomed to tourists suffering from dizzy spells or disorientation after viewing the statue of David, the artworks of the Uffizi Gallery, and other historic treasures of the Tuscan city.

Though there are numerous accounts of people fainting while taking in Florentine art, dating from the early 19th century, the syndrome was only named in 1979, when it was described by Italian psychiatrist Graziella Magherini, who observed over a hundred similar cases among tourists in Florence. There exists no scientific evidence to define Stendhal syndrome as a specific psychiatric disorder; however, there is evidence that the same cerebral areas involved in emotional responses are activated during exposure to art. The syndrome is not listed as a recognised condition in the Diagnostic and Statistical Manual of Mental Disorders.

A more recent account of the Stendhal syndrome was in 2018, where a visitor to the Uffizi Gallery in Florence suffered a heart attack while admiring Sandro Botticelli's The Birth of Venus.

See also
 Jerusalem syndrome
 Lisztomania
 Paris syndrome
 The Stendhal Syndrome, a 1996 psychological thriller film on the subject

References

External links
 Word Spy definition
 Graziella Magherini. La Sindrome di Stendhal. Firenze, Ponte Alle Grazie, 1989. 

Somatic symptom disorders
Psychopathological syndromes
Stendhal